Dinesh Kumar Mishra (born 1948) is the convenor of Barh Mukti Abhiyan, an NGO which is mounting a grassroots movement that challenges the current, top-heavy flood control policy in India.

Life

According to Dinesh Kumar Mishra, dams and  embankments, based on past experience, are not reliable, so control over rivers should be given back to the community, which can manage and cope with flooding. Dinesh Kumar Mishra has graduated as civil engineer from IIT Kharagpur in 1968. In 1970, he completed M.Tech. from the same institute and later in 2006 completed his Ph.D. from South Gujarat University. Dinesh Kumar Mishra is also director of Maryland Institute of Technology and Management, Galudih, Jamshedpur.

References

Living people
IIT Kharagpur alumni
People from Bihar
1948 births